Captain William Wallace Cranston (November 20, 1838 to December 7, 1907) was an American soldier who fought in the American Civil War. Cranston received the country's highest award for bravery during combat, the Medal of Honor, for his action during the Battle of Chancellorsville in Virginia on 2 May 1863. He was honored with the award on 15 December 1892.

Biography
Cranston was born in Woodstock, Ohio on 20 November 1838. He enlisted into the 66th Ohio Infantry. After the war, he moved to Kansas and was elected to the Kansas House of Representatives from the 28th District, serving from 1889 to 1891. He died on 7 December 1907 at the age of 66, and his remains are interred at Oakwood Cemetery, Parsons, Kansas.

Medal of Honor citation

See also

List of American Civil War Medal of Honor recipients: A–F
Battle of Vicksburg
66th Ohio Volunteer Infantry Regiment

Notes

References

External links

A Forlorn Hope
Vicksburg Medal of Honor Recipients

1838 births
1907 deaths
People of Ohio in the American Civil War
Union Army officers
United States Army Medal of Honor recipients
American Civil War recipients of the Medal of Honor